Pill-Soon Song is a professor in Jeju National University, Jeju, Korea. Song specializes in molecular photobiology. He worked on the structure-function relation of phytochromes and other photoreceptors including stentorin and blepharismin. Presently, his research revolves around the molecular mechanisms involved in overexpression of phytochrome and its related genes in turfgrass and other plant species.  Acknowledging his contributions to photobiology, he was elected as Editor-in-Chief for the American Society for Photobiology journal, Photochemistry and Photobiology (1975–1994) and received the Finsen Medal in 2009 awarded by the International Union of Photobiology.

Life and education
He  received his Ph.D from University of California, Davis in 1964. After a post-doctoral research fellowship at Iowa State University under Prof. David E. Metzler from 1964–65, he then  joined  Texas Tech Univ, Lubbock, Texas, USA as Assistant Professor in Chemistry.

Awards and honors
Among Song's awards and honours are:
1975-1987     Paul Whitfield Horn Professorship, Texas Tech Univ., Lubbock, TX
1978          Faculty Distinguished Published Research Award, Texas Tech Univ. DADS  Association & Hemphill Wells Foundation, Plaque and Award
1979          Faculty Research Award, College of Arts and Sciences, Texas Tech Univ., Lubbock, TX, Plaque and Award
1990-2003     Dow Chemical Company Distinguished Professorship, UNL
1991          Outstanding Research Award, American Society for Photobiology (based on work published through 1989/90)
1996          Member (Elected), Korean Academy of Science and Technology
1996          Outstanding Alumni Achievement Award, 90th Anniversary of the College of Agriculture and Life Sciences, Seoul National Univ., October 1997
1997          Life Member (Elected), Korean Academy of Science and Technology
1997          Outstanding Research Achievement Medal, European Society for Photobiology, presented at the 1997 ESP Congress, Stresa, Italy, September, 1997.
1998          Univ.  of  Hasanuddin  Univ. Presidential Medal, Photobiology Contributions, Ujung Pandang, Indonesia, September, 1998
2000          Lifetime Achievement Award, American  Society for  Photobiology/13th International Congress on Photobiology, San Francisco, July 1–6, 2000
2000	       Outstanding Research and Creative Activity Award, State of Nebraska/Univ. of Nebraska, Lincoln, March 29, 2000
2000          Ho-Am Prize in Science, The Ho-Am Foundation/Samsung Corporation, June 1, 2000
2007          Outstanding Alumnus, Hall of Fame, Seoul Natl Univ. College of Agriculture and Life Sciences
2009          Finsen Medal in Photobiology, International Union of Photobiology, June 18, 2009

References

External links 
 official CV

Living people
1936 births
South Korean molecular biologists
Recipients of the Ho-Am Prize in Science
University of California, Davis alumni